The Test of Proficiency in Korean (TOPIK) is a test to measure the Korean language proficiency of non-native speakers in South Korea. This examination system was introduced by the South Korean government in 1997 and conducted by a branch of the Ministry of Education of the country.

The test is offered six times annually (Jan, Apr, May, Jul, Oct, Nov) within South Korea and less often to people studying Korean in other countries. The test is for individuals whose first language is not Korean and is taken by overseas ethnic Koreans, those wishing to study at a Korean university, and for those who want to be employed at Korean companies in and outside of Korea.

History
The test was first administered in 1997 and taken by 2,274 people. Initially the test was held only once a year. In 2009, 180,000 people took the test. The Korean government introduced a law in 2007 that required Chinese workers of Korean descent with no relatives in Korea to attain more than 200 points (out of 400) in the Business TOPIK (B-TOPIK) so they could be entered into a lottery for work visa. 

In 1997 – 1998, TOPIK was administered by Korea Research Foundation (KRF).

In 2012, more than 150,000 candidates took the TOPIK, and the total number of people who have taken the test since its date of inception surpassed 1 million.

Format

Old format
In previous years, the test was divided into four parts: vocabulary and grammar, writing, listening, and reading. Two versions of the test were offered: the Standard (S)-TOPIK and the Business (B)-TOPIK. There were three different levels of S-TOPIK: beginner (초급), intermediate (중급), and advanced (고급). Depending on the average score and minimum marks in each section it was possible to obtain grades 1-2 in beginner, 3-4 in intermediate and 5-6 in advanced S-TOPIK. In B-TOPIK the scores in each section (out of 100) were added together to give a score out of 400.

New format
A new format of the TOPIK took effect from the 35th TOPIK test, held on 20 July 2014. Instead of the original ternary (Beginner, Intermediate and Advanced) classification, there are now only two test levels – TOPIK I and TOPIK II. TOPIK I has sub-levels 1 and 2, whereas TOPIK II has four sub-levels from 3 to 6. Another important change is that now the TOPIK I has only two sections – Reading and Listening, instead of four sections in the old format. TOPIK II has three sections – Reading, Listening and Writing.

Validity
The test results are valid for two years after the announcement of examination results.

Grading
TOPIK I is the basic level test containing two obtainable grades, while TOPIK II is the combined intermediate/advanced level with four obtainable grades. The evaluation is based on the total number of points earned.

Structure of questions
The test consists of mostly multiple-choice questions; however, the TOPIK II level writing examination will require a short-answer. TOPIK I consists of multiple-choice questions for listening (40 minutes long with 30 questions) and reading (60 minutes long with 40 questions). Both examination areas are worth a score of 100 with a combining score of 200. TOPIK II has two slots. The first slot is the listening examination (60 minutes long with 50 questions) and writing (50 minutes long with 4 short-answer questions). The second slot is for the reading examination (70 minutes long with 50 questions). All three examinations of TOPIK II are worth a score of 100 with a combining score of 300.

Use of the test result
 Korean university admission for foreigners.
 Obtaining work visas for local Korean companies.
 Recognizing domestic practitioner license for foreigners with medical doctor qualifications.
 For the application of a Korean Language Teaching Qualification test (level 2 and 3) and acquisition of certificate.
 To apply for permanent residency.
 To obtain marriage based immigrant visa.

Testing locations
As of February 2021, there are 314 testing centers, with 54 in South Korea and the remaining are in 87 countries. 
In addition to Korea, TOPIK is available in the following countries and districts: Argentina, Armenia, Australia, Azerbaijan, Bangladesh, Belarus, Brazil, Bulgaria, Cambodia, Canada, Chile, China, Colombia, Cuba, Czech Republic, Egypt, France, Germany, Hungary, India, Indonesia, Iran, Italy, Japan, Jordan,Kazakhstan, Kyrgyzstan, Malaysia, Mexico, Mongolia, Morocco, Myanmar, Nepal, Netherlands, New Zealand, Pakistan, Paraguay, Philippines, Portugal, Poland, Russia, Romania, Singapore, Spain, Taiwan, Tajikistan, Turkey, UAE, Ukraine, USA, United Kingdom, Uzbekistan, and Vietnam. Examination times are divided into three time zones: China and marginal states (China, Hong Kong, Mongolia, Philippines, Taiwan, Singapore and Brunei; which shares the same time zone of UTC+8), Korea and Japan (which shares the same time zone of UTC+9), and other countries (which follows local time of a specific country). In India, TOPIK test is conducted in 5 cities - New Delhi, Chennai, Hyderabad, Ranchi, and Manipur.

See also 

 Korean Language Proficiency Test

References

External links
Official website 
NIIED homepage 
TOPIK Web Practice

Education in South Korea
Korean language tests